Deluxe Crazy is a 1963 Greek film directed by Stefanos Fotiadis and starring Giorgos Pantzas, Mimis Fotopoulos and Giannis Gkionakis.

Plot

A young relative of a rich family was love-struck with a theatrical lady with the different untamed character and pressures with his family that did not had the time to come.  As the movie did not have from it greatest from their family, received to bring an abundant laughs due to its much great stars of the movie.

Cast

Giorgos Pantzas ..... Fedon Zarangis
Mimis Fotopoulos ..... Kyriakos
Giannis Gionakis ..... Babis
Alekos Livaditis ..... Lazaros
Giorgos Konstantinou ..... Minas
Eleni Anousaki ..... Marina
Kaiti Panou ..... Melpo
Giorgos Tsitsopoulos ..... Alekos
Rena Dor ..... Theano Skropolithra
 Kostas Mentis ..... postman
 Clairi Deligianni ..... Yiouli

See also
List of Greek films

External links

Treli politelias at cine.gr 

1963 films
1963 comedy films
Greek comedy films
1960s Greek-language films